The Umpila people are an Aboriginal Australian people of the eastern Cape York Peninsula in northern Queensland. The majority of the remnant of the Umpila now live in Lockhart.

Language

Umpila is classified as one of the North Cape York Paman languages. It is one of 6 dialects which are often collectively referred to as Umpila, and, though classified as moribund, it is still spoken by elders, along with Kuuku Ya'u/Koko Yao and Kaantju, and efforts are being made to revitalize it. The process of reduplication in Umpila is used for the progressive aspect, creating forms that are "bewilderingly varied".

Country
Umpila country has been called 'one of the most ecologically intact indigenous domains on earth.' It stretches over some  around Cape Sidmouth north to Night Island, and to the Chester River. Their territory is very rich in its biodiversity heritage, with some 260 plant species unique to their region. To their north were the Uutaalnganu, while their southern borders ran up to those of the Lama Lama.

History
The Umpila were forcibly removed from their land in the 1940s. Most now live in the Lockhart River Community

Society
The Umpila call themselves Umpila pama malngkanichi, "people of the sand beach", a term which refers to their belonging to the ethnocultural group of Kawadji of north-eastern Queensland coastal dwellers. Their society had two exogamous patrimoieties, kaapay(karrpiya/ karpeya) and kuyan (koiyan), two terms which are also used to classify flora and fauna. The two patrimoieties marry their opposite moiety, resulting in the acquisition of the resulting children to the father's moiety.

Strict rules also govern social interaction between certain grades of affine relationship. Two of the most knowledgeable informants, the tribal elder Horace Rocky and the young park ranger Johanne Omeenyo cannot speak to each other, since a classificatory nephew like Johanne is forbidden to speak directly to his 'uncle', and they must use clan intermediaries.

Native title
 
The descendants of the Umpila people had their rights to native title recognised by a Federal Court decision in 2008.

Some words
  (red).
  (white)
  (black)

Alternative names
 Koko-umpilo
 Ompeila Ompela, Oombilla

Source:

Notes

Citations

Sources

Aboriginal peoples of Queensland